Aleksandr Aleksandrovich Sayenko (born 5 March 1978 in Potsdam) is a former Russian football player.

External links
 

1978 births
Sportspeople from Potsdam
Living people
Russian footballers
FC Rostov players
Russian Premier League players
FC Kuban Krasnodar players
Association football midfielders
Footballers from Brandenburg
FC Spartak-UGP Anapa players